The Protestant Church is a Christian church in Tabriz in northwestern Iran.

It is located in south Shahnaz street, near the Ararat Cultural Complex of the city.

References 

  Editorial Board, East Azarbaijan Geography, Iranian Ministry of Education, 2000 (High School Text Book in Persian)
 http://www.eachto.ir

Tabriz
Churches in Iran
Architecture in Iran
Churches in Tabriz